Geoff Thompson (born 26 January 1960) is a BAFTA-winning writer, film-maker, spiritual teacher, and martial artist.  He has written prolifically in a wide range of genres, including books on spirituality, self-help, self defence, and martial arts, and scripts for film and stage.

Biography

Early life
Geoff Thompson was born on 26 January 1960 in Coventry, United Kingdom.

Thompson had been a student of martial arts since a child and gained a high rank in Karate.  His fear of violent confrontation despite being a highly ranked martial artist encouraged Geoff to become a night club bouncer in order to confront his fear.  His experiences on the night club door, combined with a life-long desire to be a writer, led to him writing the manuscript of his first book Bouncer.  Thompson says this was written on the toilet of the factory in Coventry where he worked as a floor sweeper, and he was encouraged by workmates to write down the bouncer stories he shared during lunch breaks.

Nightclub bouncer and first book (1980s)
Thompson left his factory job and became a full-time martial arts instructor, teaching martial arts during the day and working as a bouncer at night.  He eventually found a publisher for his first book Bouncer (later re-published as Watch My Back), and shortly afterwards quit working as a bouncer - partly due to his notoriety since publishing his book - to focus on martial arts and writing.

World-renowned martial artist (1990s)
Thompson became a world renowned martial artist specialising in 'reality' martial arts and self defence, based on his experience at the night club door, and co-founded the British Combat Association with Peter Consterdine. Thompson became famous as a self defence instructor and in particular for his concept of "The Wall".  He taught seminars in the US for Chuck Norris.

Film writing and BAFTA award
Thompson began writing for film with his script for the short film Bouncer in 2003, which went on to star Ray Winstone and was nominated for a BAFTA award. He wrote the script for a short film Brown Paper Bag, based on his own brother's problems with alcoholism that eventually led to his death in 1999, and this won Thompson a BAFTA award in 2004 for Best Short Film.

Geoff went on to write the film script for the feature film Clubbed (2008), based on his autobiography Watch My Back, starring Colin Salmon.

He wrote the screenplay for the feature film The Pyramid Texts (2015), starring James Cosmo.  Thompson made his directorial debut in 2015 with the short film The 20 Minute Film Pitch.

His work Romans 12:20, directed by the Shammasian Brothers and starring Craig Conway, (2008), has been adapted into a feature film, Romans (2017), starring Orlando Bloom.

Writing for stage
Thompson has written successfully for stage, including the play Fragile which is semi-autobiographical and showed in Coventry.

Spiritual teacher, podcast, TED talk
Alongside writing, for many years Thompson was a spiritual teacher and coach, drawing upon his own experiences as a martial artist and of personal problems that he had contended with, which inspired his self-help books.

Thompson produced a popular podcast on spiritual guidance and self-help for a number of years, and in 2016 he presented a TED talk entitled Conquering Fear.

Recent years
In 2020 he released an autobiography, Notes from a Factory Floor and the spiritual self-help text The Divine CEO.

Filmography

Feature films
Clubbed (2008) – Writer, starring Colin Salmon
The Pyramid Texts (2015) – Writer, starring James Cosmo
Romans (2017) – Writer, starring Orlando Bloom.  Later renamed Retaliation.

Short films
Bouncer (2002) – Writer, starring Ray Winstone.  BAFTA nominated.
Brown Paper Bag (2003) - Writer, starring Ronnie Fox.  BAFTA winning.
Romans 12:20 (2008) – Writer
Pink (2009) – Writer
Counting Backwards (2014) – Writer
The 20 Minute Film Pitch (2015) – Writer and Director
Shadow (2017) – Writer

Bibliography

Thompson has written and co-authored more than eighty books.

Autobiography
Notes from a Factory Floor (2020), Urbane Publications, 
Watch My Back (2004), Summersdale,  Originally published as "Bouncer" in two parts c. 1989.

Self-help / Spirituality
The Divine CEO (2020), O-BOOKS, 
The Caretaker (2014), Geoff Thompson Ltd, 
Hunting the Shadow – How to Turn Fear into Massive Success (2012), Geoff Thompson Ltd, 
The Beginner's Guide to Darkness (2011), Geoff Thompson Ltd, 
The Formula – The Secret to a Better Life (2011), Summersdale, 
Live Your Dreams – Ten Secrets to Loving Your Life (2010), Summersdale, 
Everything that Happens to Me is Fantastic (2008/9), Summersdale, 
Everything that Happens to Me is Good (2008/9), Summersdale, 
Everything that Happens to Me is Great (2008/9), Summersdale, 
Fear – the Friend of Exceptional People (2006), Geoff Thompson Ltd, 
Warrior – A Path to Self Sovereignty (2005), Geoff Thompson Ltd, 
Stress Buster – How to Stop Stress from Killing You (2005), Summersdale, 
Shape Shifter – Transform Your Life in 1 Day (2004), Summersdale, 
The Elephant and the Twig – The Art of Positive Thinking (2001), Summersdale,

Screenplay
Fragile, Geoff Thompson Ltd, 
The Pyramid Texts, Geoff Thompson Ltd,

Fiction
Red Mist (2004), Summersdale,

Martial arts / Self-defence
Dead or Alive: The Choice Is Yours – The Definitive Self-protection Handbook (2004), Summersdale, 
Animal Day – Pressure Testing the Martial Arts, Summersdale, 
Arm Bars and Joint Locks, Summersdale, 
The Art of Fighting without Fighting – Techniques in Personal Threat Evasion, Summersdale, 
Chokes and Strangles, Summersdale, 
The Escapes, Summersdale, 
The Fence – The Art of Protection, Summersdale, 
Fighting from Your Back, Summersdale, 
Fighting from your Knees, Summersdale, 
Pins – The Bedrock, Summersdale, 
Real Head, Knees and Elbows, Summersdale, 
Real Punching, Summersdale, 
Real Kicking, Summersdale, 
Three Second Fighter – Sniper Option, Summersdale, 
The Throws and Takedowns of Freestyle Wrestling, Summersdale, ASIN: B0061MRQSU
The Throws and Takedowns of Greco-Roman Wrestling, Summersdale, 
The Throws and Takedowns of Judo, Summersdale, 
The Throws and Takedowns of Sombo, Summersdale, 
Weight Training for the Martial Artist, Summersdale, ASIN: B0061NWC8I

Martial arts
Thompson began his martial arts training in the Eastern arts including karate, aikido and kung-fu. However, during his time as a nightclub doorman, he found that what he had learned was inadequate for the reality of violence. Thompson came to realise that the techniques encouraged and practiced in touch-contact and semi-contact martial arts were not always suitable for self-defence. Though he utilises a small core of these techniques as part of his teachings, Thompson prefers full-contact martial arts and combat sports such as boxing, Muay Thai, judo, Brazilian jiu-jitsu, Greco-Roman- and freestyle wrestling.

He holds the ABA Boxing Instructor certificate and high-level coaching awards for wrestling, a 1st Dan in Judo (1997) under world champion Neil Adams, and an 8th dan in Shotokan Karate. Geoff is a Joint Chief Instructor of the British Combat Association.

Geoff Thompson was also the first instructor to name and extensively teach "the fence", a technique in real-life defence involving keeping your hands in front of you in a non-threatening manner so as to protect yourself in case a situation escalates but without provoking violence.

In the 1990s, Thompson wrote and presented a wide range of martial arts and self-defence DVDs.  In 1995, he and his self-defence school featured in the Channel 4 documentary Passengers.

Martial arts instructional DVDs
The Escapes (2005), Summersdale Productions, ASIN: B0007NLRT8
Ground Fighting – Chokes and Strangles (2005), Summersdale Productions, ASIN: B0007NLRU2
Pins – The Bedrock (2005), Summersdale Productions, ASIN: B0007NLRSY
The Pavement Arena Part One (2005), Summersdale Productions, ASIN: B0007NLRWA,
The Pavement Arena Part Two – The Protection Pyramid  (2005), Summersdale Productions, ASIN: B01I05LPZ0
The Pavement Arena Part Three – Grappling, The Last Resort(2005), Summersdale Productions, ASIN: B0007NLRWU
The Pavement Arena Part Four; Fit to Fight (2005), Summersdale Productions, ASIN: B0007NLRX4,
Real Punching: The One Punch Kill (2005), Summersdale Productions, ASIN: B0007NLRS4
The Ultimate Self Defence Seminar (2006), Summersdale Productions, ASIN: B000CR6X5C

References

External links
Geoff Thompson IMDB page  
Interview with Geoff Thompson and SUBvert magazine

People from Coventry
1960 births
Living people
British male karateka
British male judoka
Shotokan practitioners
BAFTA winners (people)
Martial arts writers